Ipsissimus is an album by John Zorn. It is the fifth album to feature the "Moonchild Trio" of Mike Patton, Joey Baron and Trevor Dunn, following Astronome (2006), Moonchild: Songs Without Words (2006),  Six Litanies for Heliogabalus (2007) and The Crucible (2008).

Description from the label
Weaving sonic dramas around the legacies of Magick and Alchemy, Moonchild is one of Zorn's most intense and powerful projects. Active since 2006, Moonchild has released four CDs speaking directly to young, open minded and curious music lovers around the world, and their newest recording is the most varied and driving to date. Nine new duos, trios and quartets swirling with melodic and rhythmic invention featuring the searing guitar of Marc Ribot, the magical vocals of Mike Patton and Zorn's manic sax with the astounding Dunn-Baron rhythm section. Ipsissimus is the fifth surprising installment in the remarkable Moonchild legacy.

Reception
Paul Serralheiro of The Squid's Ear stated "The most striking aspect of John Zorn's recent music is the vein of mystic bipolarity it may be said to exhibit. Thus Ipsissimus navigates between heavy-metal demonic invocation and redemption music." Thom Jurek of AllMusic commented "This is an eclectic offering even by Moonchild's standards; one that feels far less focused and looser than anything else they've released. It bears many of Zorn's signature traits from the past without pointing a direct way forward. This is not a complaint, necessarily, but merely a new way to encounter the familiar."

Track listing
 Seven Sigils
 The Book of Los
 Apparitions I
 Supplicant
 Tabula Smaragdina
 Apparitions II
 The Changeling
 Warlock
 Apparitions III

Personnel
John Zorn – alto sax, piano, composer 
Joey Baron – drums 
Trevor Dunn – bass 
Mike Patton – voice
Marc Ribot – guitar

References

2010 albums
Moonchild albums
Albums produced by John Zorn
Tzadik Records albums